Carlos Alberto Vázquez (born 13 February 1934) is a former Argentine cyclist. He competed in the men's sprint and the 1000m time trial events at the 1964 Summer Olympics.

References

1934 births
Living people
Argentine male cyclists
Olympic cyclists of Argentina
Cyclists at the 1964 Summer Olympics
Place of birth missing (living people)
Pan American Games medalists in cycling
Pan American Games gold medalists for Argentina
Pan American Games bronze medalists for Argentina
Cyclists at the 1967 Pan American Games
Medalists at the 1967 Pan American Games